Lesley J. Saweard (born 1934) is a British former actress. She played Christine Barford in the long-running radio soap opera, The Archers, from 1953 until 2019.

Saweard was born in Grimsby, Lincolnshire in 1934, to parents William and Hilda (née Kiddle). In 1953, she began playing the role of Christine Barford (the sister of established character Phil Archer) in BBC Radio 4 soap opera The Archers; she remained in the programme until 2019, apart from a break during the 1960s, between 1962 and returning in 1968.

Saweard lives in  Louth. In 1956, she married Geoffrey Lewis, who she met on The Archers two years before. They had two children before his death in 1997.

References

British radio actresses
The Archers
1934 births
Living people